Jubula is a genus of liverwort in the family Jubulaceae.

Taxonomy
Species within Jubula include:
 Jubula blepharophylla
 Jubula bogotensis
 Jubula hattorii
 Jubula hutchinsiae
 Jubula japonica
 Jubula kwangsiensis
 Jubula pennsylvanica
 Jubula tonkinensis

References

Jubulaceae
Liverwort genera